Soup joumou is a soup native to Haitian cuisine. In 2021, soup joumou was added to the UNESCO Intangible Cultural Heritage List.

The soup is traditionally cooked with winter squashes such as the turban squash. The squash slices are simmered in a saucepan along with pieces of beef and soup bones, potato, and vegetables such as malanga, leeks, celery, radishes, carrots, green cabbage, habanero pepper and onions. The squash is then puréed, usually in a food processor, with water and the purée is returned to the saucepan. Salt and seasoning along with lime juice, garlic, parsley and other herbs and spices are then added. Some Haitians add thin pasta such as vermicelli and macaroni and a small amount of butter or oil. The soup is always served hot and is usually accompanied with a sliced bread which is dipped in the soup.

Preparation 
Joumou soup is a mildy spicy soup native to Haitian cuisine. The soup is traditionally cooked in pumpkin winter squash.

The main ingredients of the Joumou Soup are: squash, beef, potatoes, malanga, and green vegetables like cabbage, celery, etc.

The soup is always served hot and is sometimes accompanied with a sliced bread which dipped in the soup.

Joumou soup is traditionally served on January 1 to commemorate the day of Haiti’s liberation from France in 1804.

Joumou is pronounced “joo-moo”.

Social connotations 

Soup joumou commemorates Haiti's liberation from French colonial rule on January 1, 1804. During slavery, only French colonial masters and plantation owners were allowed to enjoy the delicacy, which was prepared by slaves. After the revolution, the free Haitians were finally able to eat the soup and it came to represent freedom, emancipation and independence. On January 1, Haitians both at home and in the diaspora eat this soup to celebrate the first successful slave rebellion that transferred political power to its freed slave majority.

UNESCO recognition 
In December 2021, Haiti obtained official recognition for the knowledge, know-how and practices pertaining to the consumption of soup joumou on the Representative List of the Intangible Cultural Heritage of Humanity by UNESCO. It was Haiti’s first inclusion on the list.

See also

 List of soups
 List of squash and pumpkin dishes

References

External links 
 
 
 
 
Mini-documentary about soup joumou (PBS, 2023)

Haitian soups
Squash and pumpkin dishes